Pan Pan (1985 – 28 December 2016) was a male giant panda who was resident at the Giant Panda Protection and Research Centre in Chengdu, China. At the time of his death, he was the oldest male giant panda in captivity. The oldest living giant panda in captivity at the time of Pan Pan's death was Basi, a female giant panda who was then 37.

Pan Pan (meaning "hope" or "expectation") was born in the wild in Baoxing County, Sichuan, China, in 1985, and after being rescued was placed in the Chengdu protection centre. He is thought to have over 130 descendants – more than a quarter of the world's captive-bred panda population. Pan Pan's children include Bai Yun (born 1991), Tian Tian (born 1997), Gu Gu (born 1999) and Lin Hui (born 2001).
Pan Pan is the great-grandfather of Toronto-born panda twins Jia Yueyue and Jia Panpan (born 2015).

Pan Pan died aged 31 at the Dujiangyan branch of the centre on 28 December 2016, six months after being diagnosed with cancer.

References 

Individual giant pandas
1985 animal births
2016 animal deaths